Borgercompagnie is a village in the Dutch province of Groningen. It consists of a single street with farms and houses on both sides. The village is about 7 km long. The north end lies close to Sappemeer in the municipality of Midden-Groningen, and the south end lies in the municipality of Veendam.

The village was founded in 1647 by the Burger Compagnie (Citizen's Company) to exploit the peat. Borgercompagnie is a linear settlement along the canal. The northern section of the canal was filled up after 1940.

In 2005, a manure fermentation factory opened in Borgercompagnie. It was originally hailed as a progressive company and received a stimulation prize. It processes 35,000 tons of manure a year, and is in ongoing dispute with their neighbours and the municipality of Veendam due to the stench.

References

External links 
 

Populated places in Groningen (province)
Midden-Groningen
Veendam
1647 establishments in the Dutch Republic